Amuka is a community settlement near Safed in the Upper Galilee in northern Israel. It belongs to the Merom HaGalil Regional Council. It is named for the Biblical city of the same name, which is presumed to be located near the present-day settlement.

History
Amuka was established in 1980 on land of the  Palestinian village  of Ammuqa, which became depopulated in the 1948 Arab–Israeli War. It is located about 1 km southeast of the site of  Ammuqa.

Education
Children in the community attend schools in nearby villages: "Nof Harim" elementary school in Sasa, "Anne Frank" high school in Sasa, "Har VeGai" high school, and Einot Yarden high school.

Synagogue

There is a large ruined building above the burial place of Jonathan ben Uzziel.  In the 19th century, the explorer  Victor Guérin saw there "the base of a pillar and a number of hewn stones - the remnants of an old structure, possibly a synagogue."

Tzvi Ilan writes that today some of the hewn stones are centralized in the center of the ruin like a platform for worship.  West of the platform is a rectangular area of 20 by 30 meters appropriate for a synagogue.  In the past there was a marble board with a figure of a grapevine.

See also
Ammuqa

References

Community settlements
Populated places in Northern District (Israel)
Populated places established in 1980
1980 establishments in Israel